A redhead is a person with red hair.

Redhead or Red Head may also refer to:

Arts
 Redhead (album), a 2003 album by Bleu
 Redhead (1919 film), a 1919 American silent drama film
 Redhead (1934 film), a 1934 American drama film
 Redhead (1941 film), a 1941 Monogram Pictures comedy/romance
 Redhead (1962 film), a 1962 German-Italian drama film directed by Helmut Käutner
 Redhead (musical), a 1959 musical
 Redheads (1992 film), a 1992 Australian film
 The Red Head (1925 film), a 1925 French silent drama film
 The Red Head (1932 film), a 1932 French drama film
 The Red Head (1952 film), a 1952 French drama film

People 
 Brian Redhead (1929–1994), British journalist and broadcaster known for presenting the Today programme
 Doreen Redhead (21st century), Canadian judge in Manitoba
 Jaylene Redhead (2007–2009), Canadian infanticide victim
 Leigh Redhead (born 1971), Australian writer
 Mark Redhead (20th and 21st century), British film producer and writer
 Cachointioni (died 1756), or Red Head, Onondaga leader

Places 
 Red Head, Florida, a community in the United States
 Redhead, New South Wales, Australia, a suburb of the City of Lake Macquarie

Biology 
 Redhead (bird), a North American duck, Aythya americana
 Redhead, colloquial name for female smew ducks
 Redhead, the milkweed plant species Asclepias curassavica

Other uses 
 Redheads (matches), a brand of matches sold in Australia
 All-American Red Heads, a professional women's basketball team
 Qizilbash, or Red Heads, 15th-century Shi'ite militants
 Redhead gauge, an ionization gauge used to measure vacuum
 Redskin (subculture),  a far-left skinhead